Fallout: New California is a fan-made modification and is an unofficial prequel to the action role-playing video game Fallout: New Vegas, made by Brandan Lee and Radian-Helix Media. It was released in two installments, with the first installment released on May 31, 2013, and the second installment released as a beta on October 23, 2018. Originally known as Fallout: Project Brazil, the modification was renamed to Fallout: New California on September 1, 2017.

In April 2018, the project entered private beta for the second installment. The public beta for Fallout: New California was released as planned on October 23, 2018.

Development
Project lead Brandan Lee of Radian-Helix Media, LLC was inspired by the games Fallout and Fallout 2 from Black Isle Studios. With the help of friends in the film, TV, radio, and live theater industries, Lee set out to create a modification of Fallout 3 for people who appreciated the style of the original Black Isle games. According to Lee, the mod was first conceptualized in 2010, but development didn't begin until 2012, with a prototype being released for Fallout 3, and the first full installment being released for New Vegas. Lee states that he headed a team of three people, with occasional community donations, who would spend four years creating the modification; eventually ending up with 5,000 lines of dialogue from twenty different actors and three hours of gameplay for the first installment alone. Lee named the mod "Project Brazil" partly due to inspiration by the Terry Gilliam film Brazil, and as a nod to Black Isle Entertainment through the Irish myth of the mythological island of Brasil.

90% of Project Brazils assets for BETA 1.0.0 were created between January 2012 and May 2013, when the story was refined after a year-long break away from the project. Lee created a worldspace the size of that found in Bethesda's Fallout 3, and wrote the dialog in tandem with level and character design. Freddie Farnsworth joined in January 2013 as lead project technician; applying a global NavMesh, and re-rendering the level of detail mesh on a computer custom built for the task. In 2017, the project was renamed to Project New California.

While in development, the final installment promised to expand upon the mod with new quests and factions. There are over 16,000 lines of dialogue in BETA 200.

Gameplay
Fallout: New California was split into two installments, the first was released in 2013, and the beta for the second installment was released on October 23, 2018. As with Fallout 3 and Fallout: New Vegas, Fallout: New California has a radio station that comments on the actions of the player as the story progresses. The radio stations in Fallout: New California debuted with a completely original soundtrack. The player's S.P.E.C.I.A.L statistics have a greater impact on dialog choices with NPCs and player skills than in Fallout: New Vegas.

Story
Fallout: New California was planned to be broken into three segments but, by December 13, 2013, the third installment was scrapped. The first installment was released on May 31, 2013, the second installment was released on October 23, 2018. There are 13 possible endings. The remaining two installments are separated into a prequel and three "chapters." The story takes place in 2260, 21 years before the start of Fallout New Vegas.

First installment
The first installment is set in Vault 18, located near the San Bernardino Mountains in the Cajon Pass, after the events of Fallout 2. Vault 18 is described as a secluded community. In the past, its residents included explorers who traveled the outside world as the "Wasteland Scouts", becoming legends for their adventures. However, after making too many enemies, the vault has cut itself off from the outside world. The aging vault population is in decline, and many of its youth are adopted from the wasteland, descended from mysteriously vanished tribes formed by former vault dwellers who left to settle the wasteland. The player and their siblings originate from one such missing tribe.

Within the game, the player can choose to be either a Warrior or a Scientist. It is revealed that one of the prominent members of the vault is part of the Enclave, after which the vault erupts into civil war, with the player being able to side with the Enclave or defend Vault 18. The first installment has around three hours of gameplay, and seven hours including all of the branching content.

Prequel
In the beginning, the player is selected as a replacement player for the "Patriots" team, on the night of the championship game of the 2260 season of the "Vault Ball" sport. During the match, the player can choose to Tackle (Path of the Warrior) or Dodge (Path of the Scientist). Depending on the choice, the player is next in Coach John Bragg's Office (Tackle), being praised for winning the game and offered a job in the Vault's security force, or in the Vault Infirmary (Dodge), waking up from being injured and losing the game, with a broken leg. As a Warrior (Tackle), the player may ingratiate themselves to Coach Bragg and his sister Chevy, the Vault Security lieutenant, thus gaining a spot in Vault Security and potentially also Bragg's special "Patriot" vault defense training program. If they fail to do so, they will instead be sent to join the Vault's maintenance team. As a Scientist (Dodge), the player is given the option to help Dr. Rossman, the vault's robotics expert, repair the vault's computer mainframe, extracting information on the history of the vault and the player character along the way. Concurrently, the player may interact with other vault residents, with some interactions determining who will or will not become a potential companion for the later installment. This section is ended at any time when the player chooses to go to sleep in their home apartment.

While the player sleeps, John and Chevy Bragg are revealed to be members of the Enclave who have used their Patriots program to indoctrinate the young vault residents into loyal Enclave soldiers. Forced to accelerate their plans for the vault, they begin a revolt, causing an explosion which collapses parts of the lower levels.

Chapter 1
The player wakes up, finding their siblings dead and their home destroyed, while the vault security forces and Enclave Patriots fight outside. The player may choose to side with Vault Security to defend the vault, or join the Enclave if their relationship with Bragg is good enough. After helping either side to gain the advantage, the player confronts the overseer and learns that he has set the vault to self-destruct. They are then told to gather their remaining allies and evacuate, and the chapter ends upon reaching the gate to the outside world beyond the vault cavern.

Second installment
The second installment, released on October 23, 2018, focuses on the player's struggle for survival in the world outside Vault 18 amidst a growing territorial conflict between two major factions. The first is the growing New California Republic (NCR), trapped in domestic turmoil amid its imperialistic vision to unify all of California, led in the region by the hawkish General William Silverman. The second is the Raider Alliance, a loose confederation of tribes, rebels, criminals, and others displaced by and radicalized against the NCR, led by the psychotic warlord Juan Maxson-Elsdragon. Two other main subfactions are the Bishops, a criminal mob family with control of NCR politics represented by Senator Paul Duville, and the Nanjima Shi, a clan of samurai-styled Japanese warriors within the Raider Alliance led by the warlord Kieva Nanjima.

Chapter 2
This chapter focuses on the player's escape from the vault before its destruction and the night that follows, during which the player is told to consider where to seek refuge in the wasteland: Union City, a makeshift township where the NCR houses its regional command, or Athens-Tec Mine, the seat of the Raider Alliance's power.

Chapter 3
This chapter focuses on the player's mysterious past, as well as their role in the conflict between the regional powers as direct warfare breaks out for control of the Pass. The player becomes a special agent for their respective faction via General Silverman or Elsdragon, working to undermine the opposing side (or potentially even undermining both sides as an undercover Enclave infiltrator.) They may also work with Senator DuVille to further the Bishops' interests or collude with Kieva Nanjima to try and overthrow Elsdragon.

Regardless of affiliation, the player is eventually sent to scavenge a pre-war military base named Fort Daggerpoint, meeting a mysterious mercenary named Annai Oran in the process. This is revealed to be a trap set by an army of super mutants called the Unity, remnants of the Master's Unity from the original Fallout, who claim that the player has a special destiny and attempt to coerce them to join their master plan. If the player escapes, they are then tasked with assassinating the opposing faction's leader, with variations depending on whether or not the player chooses to help Senator DuVille or Kieva Nanjima instead. Finally, the player is sent to fight their way through Fort Daggerpoint, where it is revealed that Colonel Bragg's Enclave force has also been hiding, to defeat the mutant and Enclave threat, or to regroup with Bragg's forces as an Enclave-affiliated player. In the depths of the fort, the player confronts the Father, the Unity's leader, who reveals that the player was a clone created by the Unity, possessing a parasite from a pre-War government experiment codenamed "Project Brazil" which gives them special regenerative powers. The Father engineered the adoption of the player into Vault 18 as a means of ensuring they would safely mature, and intends to use the player's fully developed parasite to fulfill the Master's original plan for humanity. After dealing with the Father, the player encounters Annai Oran, who confirms the player's origins and reveals that she is actually a mutant who possesses a defective version of the Project Brazil parasite, and that the Bragg siblings are clones of her created via the parasite's defect. Alternatively, the player regroups with Colonel Bragg as an Enclave infiltrator before they are attacked by Oran. The player either helps Annai defeat her clones, during which she sacrifices herself to end the threat of Project Brazil, or helps the Braggs eliminate Oran to consolidate their victory.

Endings
In the majority of endings, the player is tasked with deciding whether to destroy Fort Daggerpoint or secure it for their faction. If the player assisted the Enclave, they instead use the fort's nuclear missiles to devastate the NCR and head east to regroup with other Enclave elements. Regardless of faction choices, the Unity is exterminated and the Raider Alliance is eventually forced out of the Pass, allowing the NCR to unify California. The player ultimately falls out of contact with their faction, prompting them to start over as a courier. During this time, they inadvertently destroy the settlement of Hopeville and lose their parasite's powers as a result, leading into the events of Fallout: New Vegas.

There are also two independent endings which do not continue the player's story into Fallout: New Vegas. These occur if the player opts to join the Unity and fulfill their plan, or if the player kills the leaders of every major faction, with the implication that as a functionally immortal entity with nothing to hold them back, they will ultimately go on to eradicate all life on the planet.

Reception
Project Brazil was ninth on Mod DB's Top Mods of 2013 list.

References

External links
 

2013 video games
Episodic video games
Gamebryo games
Interquel video games
Role-playing video games
Video game mods
Video games developed in the United States
Video games set in California
Video games set in the 23rd century
Windows games
Windows-only games